Hugh Nibloe (born  in Stranraer, Scotland) is a Scottish wheelchair curler.

Career
He participated at the 2018 Winter Paralympics where British team finished on seventh place.

Teams

References

External links

 ParalympicsGB | Hugh Nibloe - British Paralympic Association
 Hugh Nibloe - Athlete Profile - Wheelchair Curling - WPG 2018 - World Para Nordic Skiing
 ParalympicsGB | Hugh nibloe's paralympic inspiration
 Hugh Nibloe – Scottish Disability Sport
 
 Video: 

Living people
1982 births
People from Stranraer
Sportspeople from Dumfries and Galloway
Scottish male curlers
Scottish wheelchair curlers
Scottish Paralympic competitors
Paralympic wheelchair curlers of Great Britain
Wheelchair curlers at the 2018 Winter Paralympics
Wheelchair curlers at the 2022 Winter Paralympics